Notobryon wardi, the iridescent nudibranch, is a species of scyllid nudibranch, and is found in South Africa. It is a marine gastropod mollusc in the family Scyllaeidae.

Distribution
This species is found around the South African coast from Elands Bay to Jeffreys Bay. It is usually found inter-tidally but has been found to 20 m.

Description
Notobryon wardi is a medium-sized (up to 50 mm) smooth-bodied nudibranch. The body is reddish-brown with iridescent blue-green spots on its sides and back. The smooth rhinophores are surrounded by cup-like sheaths. Two sets of wispy gills are flanked by flattened lobes extending from the body.

Ecology
Notobryon wardi feeds on hydroids. It can swim when disturbed using lateral movements of its body.

References

External links
 http://www.seaslugforum.net/notoward.htm

Scyllaeidae